Earl Williams may refer to:
Earl Williams (1920s catcher) (1903–1958), Major League Baseball player, 1928
Earl Williams (1970s catcher) (1948–2013), Major League Baseball player, 1970–1977
Earl Williams (basketball coach), American basketball coach (1905–1908) of the Akron Zips
Earl Williams (basketball player) (born 1951), American-Israeli basketball player
Earl Williams (politician) (born 1964), former Leader of the Opposition in Dominica
Earl Larkin Williams (1903–1974), American astronomer and mathematician
Earl Williams, fictional accused murderer played by John Qualen in His Girl Friday (1940)

See also
Earle Williams (1880–1927), silent film actor
Earle E. Williams (1898–1983), California historian